The Braille pattern dots-12456 is a 6-dot braille cell with both top, both middle, and the bottom right dots raised, or an 8-dot braille cell with both top, both upper-middle, and the lower-middle right dots raised. It is represented by the Unicode code point U+283b, and in Braille ASCII with a closing bracket: .

Unified Braille

In unified international braille, the braille pattern dots-12456 is used to represent coronal or dorsal flaps, trills, or approximant consonants such as /r/, /ɹ/, /ɽ/, or /ʀ/ when multiple letters correspond to these values, and is otherwise assigned as needed.

Table of unified braille values

Other braille

Plus dots 7 and 8

Related to Braille pattern dots-12456 are Braille patterns 124567, 124568, and 1245678, which are used in 8-dot braille systems, such as Gardner-Salinas and Luxembourgish Braille.

Related 8-dot kantenji patterns

In the Japanese kantenji braille, the standard 8-dot Braille patterns 23568, 123568, 234568, and 1234568 are the patterns related to Braille pattern dots-12456, since the two additional dots of kantenji patterns 012456, 124567, and 0124567 are placed above the base 6-dot cell, instead of below, as in standard 8-dot braille.

Kantenji using braille patterns 23568, 123568, 234568, or 1234568

This listing includes kantenji using Braille pattern dots-12456 for all 6349 kanji found in JIS C 6226-1978.

  - 食

Variants and thematic compounds

  -  selector 4 + せ/食  =  毛
  -  せ/食 + selector 1  =  鳥
  -  せ/食 + selector 2  =  魚
  -  せ/食 + selector 3  =  酉
  -  せ/食 + selector 4  =  酸
  -  せ/食 + selector 6  =  酋
  -  数 + せ/食  =  千
  -  し/巿 + せ/食  =  青

Compounds of 食

  -  ん/止 + せ/食  =  飲
  -  ん/止 + ん/止 + せ/食  =  飮
  -  せ/食 + む/車  =  蝕
  -  せ/食 + 龸  =  飢
  -  せ/食 + ん/止  =  飯
  -  せ/食 + な/亻  =  飴
  -  せ/食 + 仁/亻  =  飼
  -  せ/食 + も/門  =  飽
  -  せ/食 + ふ/女  =  飾
  -  せ/食 + と/戸  =  餅
  -  せ/食 + せ/食 + と/戸  =  餠
  -  せ/食 + え/訁  =  餌
  -  せ/食 + ゑ/訁  =  餐
  -  せ/食 + 囗  =  餓
  -  せ/食 + ら/月  =  館
  -  せ/食 + ゐ/幺  =  饗
  -  れ/口 + せ/食 + せ/食  =  喰
  -  れ/口 + せ/食 + せ/食  =  喰
  -  せ/食 + 比 + ふ/女  =  飩
  -  せ/食 + 龸 + け/犬  =  飫
  -  ぬ/力 + 宿 + せ/食  =  飭
  -  せ/食 + 宿 + ち/竹  =  餃
  -  せ/食 + 囗 + こ/子  =  餉
  -  せ/食 + ふ/女 + 龸  =  餒
  -  せ/食 + 龸 + ほ/方  =  餔
  -  せ/食 + く/艹 + ほ/方  =  餝
  -  せ/食 + 宿 + 囗  =  餞
  -  せ/食 + 宿 + ぬ/力  =  餡
  -  せ/食 + 宿 + 火  =  餤
  -  せ/食 + selector 6 + ら/月  =  餬
  -  せ/食 + 宿 + う/宀/#3  =  餮
  -  せ/食 + お/頁 + に/氵  =  餽
  -  せ/食 + 龸 + ら/月  =  餾
  -  せ/食 + 宿 + ⺼  =  饂
  -  せ/食 + 龸 + ま/石  =  饅
  -  せ/食 + 宿 + き/木  =  饉
  -  せ/食 + を/貝 + き/木  =  饋
  -  せ/食 + 宿 + こ/子  =  饌
  -  せ/食 + る/忄 + selector 1  =  饐
  -  せ/食 + ゐ/幺 + 囗  =  饑
  -  せ/食 + 宿 + つ/土  =  饒
  -  せ/食 + れ/口 + す/発  =  饕

Compounds of 毛

  -  と/戸 + せ/食  =  尾
  -  き/木 + と/戸 + せ/食  =  梶
  -  ほ/方 + せ/食  =  毟
  -  龸 + せ/食  =  毫
  -  き/木 + せ/食  =  耗
  -  ほ/方 + selector 4 + せ/食  =  旄
  -  せ/食 + selector 4 + せ/食  =  毳
  -  囗 + selector 4 + せ/食  =  氈
  -  か/金 + selector 4 + せ/食  =  瓱
  -  と/戸 + selector 4 + せ/食  =  耄
  -  ま/石 + selector 4 + せ/食  =  麾

Compounds of 鳥

  -  心 + せ/食  =  蔦
  -  お/頁 + せ/食  =  鳩
  -  囗 + せ/食  =  鳴
  -  も/門 + せ/食  =  鴎
  -  こ/子 + せ/食  =  鴨
  -  火 + せ/食  =  鴬
  -  ら/月 + せ/食  =  鵬
  -  た/⽥ + せ/食  =  鵯
  -  ゐ/幺 + せ/食  =  鶏
  -  ゐ/幺 + ゐ/幺 + せ/食  =  鷄
  -  比 + せ/食  =  鶴
  -  仁/亻 + せ/食  =  鷲
  -  み/耳 + せ/食  =  鷺
  -  せ/食 + や/疒  =  島
  -  て/扌 + せ/食 + や/疒  =  搗
  -  き/木 + せ/食 + や/疒  =  槝
  -  せ/食 + う/宀/#3  =  烏
  -  れ/口 + せ/食 + う/宀/#3  =  嗚
  -  つ/土 + せ/食 + う/宀/#3  =  塢
  -  や/疒 + せ/食 + selector 1  =  嶋
  -  き/木 + せ/食 + selector 1  =  樢
  -  selector 4 + せ/食 + selector 1  =  鳫
  -  宿 + せ/食 + selector 1  =  鳬
  -  ひ/辶 + せ/食 + selector 1  =  鶫
  -  め/目 + せ/食 + selector 1  =  鷆
  -  よ/广 + せ/食 + selector 1  =  鷸
  -  龸 + せ/食 + selector 1  =  鷽
  -  や/疒 + う/宀/#3 + せ/食  =  嶌
  -  き/木 + 宿 + せ/食  =  梟
  -  龸 + う/宀/#3 + せ/食  =  鳧
  -  な/亻 + 龸 + せ/食  =  鳰
  -  む/車 + 宿 + せ/食  =  鳳
  -  と/戸 + 宿 + せ/食  =  鳶
  -  て/扌 + 宿 + せ/食  =  鴃
  -  氷/氵 + 宿 + せ/食  =  鴆
  -  ろ/十 + 龸 + せ/食  =  鴇
  -  よ/广 + 龸 + せ/食  =  鴈
  -  め/目 + 宿 + せ/食  =  鴉
  -  ろ/十 + 宿 + せ/食  =  鴒
  -  ひ/辶 + 龸 + せ/食  =  鴕
  -  さ/阝 + 宿 + せ/食  =  鴛
  -  ん/止 + 宿 + せ/食  =  鴟
  -  れ/口 + 龸 + せ/食  =  鴣
  -  お/頁 + 宿 + せ/食  =  鴦
  -  う/宀/#3 + 宿 + せ/食  =  鴪
  -  た/⽥ + 宿 + せ/食  =  鴫
  -  に/氵 + 宿 + せ/食  =  鴻
  -  む/車 + 龸 + せ/食  =  鴾
  -  り/分 + 龸 + せ/食  =  鴿
  -  ち/竹 + 宿 + せ/食  =  鵁
  -  ゆ/彳 + 龸 + せ/食  =  鵄
  -  ゆ/彳 + う/宀/#3 + せ/食  =  鵆
  -  み/耳 + 龸 + せ/食  =  鵈
  -  ふ/女 + 宿 + せ/食  =  鵐
  -  ら/月 + 宿 + せ/食  =  鵑
  -  を/貝 + 龸 + せ/食  =  鵙
  -  ゆ/彳 + 宿 + せ/食  =  鵜
  -  囗 + selector 1 + せ/食  =  鵝
  -  囗 + 宿 + せ/食  =  鵞
  -  く/艹 + 宿 + せ/食  =  鵠
  -  囗 + 龸 + せ/食  =  鵡
  -  囗 + う/宀/#3 + せ/食  =  鵤
  -  ね/示 + 宿 + せ/食  =  鵲
  -  龸 + 龸 + せ/食  =  鵺
  -  ひ/辶 + う/宀/#3 + せ/食  =  鶇
  -  龸 + 宿 + せ/食  =  鶉
  -  け/犬 + 龸 + せ/食  =  鶚
  -  宿 + 宿 + せ/食  =  鶤
  -  よ/广 + う/宀/#3 + せ/食  =  鶩
  -  火 + 宿 + せ/食  =  鶯
  -  こ/子 + 宿 + せ/食  =  鶲
  -  ひ/辶 + 宿 + せ/食  =  鶸
  -  仁/亻 + 宿 + せ/食  =  鶺
  -  か/金 + 宿 + せ/食  =  鶻
  -  り/分 + 宿 + せ/食  =  鷁
  -  か/金 + 龸 + せ/食  =  鷂
  -  め/目 + 龸 + せ/食  =  鷏
  -  と/戸 + 龸 + せ/食  =  鷓
  -  つ/土 + 龸 + せ/食  =  鷙
  -  い/糹/#2 + 宿 + せ/食  =  鷦
  -  の/禾 + 宿 + せ/食  =  鷭
  -  ろ/十 + う/宀/#3 + せ/食  =  鷯
  -  よ/广 + 宿 + せ/食  =  鷹
  -  を/貝 + 宿 + せ/食  =  鸚
  -  け/犬 + 宿 + せ/食  =  鸛
  -  え/訁 + 宿 + せ/食  =  鸞

Compounds of 魚

  -  せ/食 + 氷/氵  =  漁
  -  せ/食 + 日  =  魯
  -  せ/食 + つ/土  =  鮭
  -  せ/食 + そ/馬  =  鮮
  -  や/疒 + せ/食 + そ/馬  =  癬
  -  心 + せ/食 + そ/馬  =  蘚
  -  せ/食 + り/分  =  鯉
  -  せ/食 + た/⽥  =  鯛
  -  せ/食 + れ/口  =  鯨
  -  せ/食 + け/犬  =  鰐
  -  せ/食 + の/禾  =  鱗
  -  せ/食 + 宿 + ほ/方  =  魴
  -  せ/食 + り/分 + か/金  =  鮃
  -  せ/食 + れ/口 + と/戸  =  鮎
  -  せ/食 + も/門 + selector 2  =  鮑
  -  せ/食 + な/亻 + し/巿  =  鮒
  -  せ/食 + 宿 + さ/阝  =  鮓
  -  せ/食 + う/宀/#3 + ま/石  =  鮖
  -  せ/食 + す/発 + selector 1  =  鮗
  -  せ/食 + う/宀/#3 + ふ/女  =  鮟
  -  せ/食 + く/艹 + さ/阝  =  鮠
  -  せ/食 + 宿 + に/氵  =  鮨
  -  せ/食 + ろ/十 + ら/月  =  鮪
  -  せ/食 + 龸 + ち/竹  =  鮫
  -  せ/食 + な/亻 + き/木  =  鮴
  -  せ/食 + そ/馬 + ⺼  =  鮹
  -  せ/食 + 龸 + ゐ/幺  =  鯀
  -  せ/食 + selector 6 + ほ/方  =  鯆
  -  せ/食 + 氷/氵 + ほ/方  =  鯊
  -  せ/食 + の/禾 + ぬ/力  =  鯏
  -  せ/食 + め/目 + し/巿  =  鯑
  -  せ/食 + 龸 + つ/土  =  鯒
  -  せ/食 + ら/月 + た/⽥  =  鯔
  -  せ/食 + selector 4 + 火  =  鯡
  -  せ/食 + こ/子 + 宿  =  鯢
  -  せ/食 + 日 + 数  =  鯣
  -  せ/食 + 日 + 比  =  鯤
  -  せ/食 + り/分 + 心  =  鯰
  -  せ/食 + す/発 + selector 3  =  鯱
  -  せ/食 + ほ/方 + 龸  =  鯲
  -  せ/食 + selector 1 + う/宀/#3  =  鯵
  -  せ/食 + け/犬 + 日  =  鰆
  -  せ/食 + 宿 + よ/广  =  鰈
  -  せ/食 + 日 + へ/⺩  =  鰉
  -  せ/食 + 比 + ひ/辶  =  鰊
  -  せ/食 + の/禾 + 火  =  鰍
  -  せ/食 + 龸 + す/発  =  鰒
  -  せ/食 + た/⽥ + 心  =  鰓
  -  せ/食 + う/宀/#3 + の/禾  =  鰕
  -  せ/食 + 龸 + ⺼  =  鰛
  -  せ/食 + う/宀/#3 + ら/月  =  鰡
  -  せ/食 + し/巿 + ら/月  =  鰤
  -  せ/食 + ⺼ + そ/馬  =  鰥
  -  せ/食 + 宿 + と/戸  =  鰭
  -  せ/食 + う/宀/#3 + ⺼  =  鰮
  -  せ/食 + ゆ/彳 + ゆ/彳  =  鰯
  -  せ/食 + ね/示 + し/巿  =  鰰
  -  せ/食 + selector 3 + ほ/方  =  鰲
  -  せ/食 + つ/土 + す/発  =  鰹
  -  せ/食 + う/宀/#3 + う/宀/#3  =  鰺
  -  せ/食 + 宿 + ま/石  =  鰻
  -  せ/食 + に/氵 + ね/示  =  鰾
  -  せ/食 + ま/石 + ろ/十  =  鱆
  -  せ/食 + よ/广 + ゆ/彳  =  鱇
  -  せ/食 + つ/土 + 囗  =  鱚
  -  せ/食 + り/分 + え/訁  =  鱠
  -  せ/食 + た/⽥ + と/戸  =  鱧
  -  せ/食 + そ/馬 + や/疒  =  鱶
  -  せ/食 + 宿 + た/⽥  =  鱸

Compounds of 酉

  -  せ/食 + き/木  =  配
  -  せ/食 + に/氵  =  酒
  -  せ/食 + ろ/十  =  酔
  -  せ/食 + せ/食 + ろ/十  =  醉
  -  せ/食 + さ/阝  =  酢
  -  せ/食 + す/発  =  酪
  -  せ/食 + か/金  =  酬
  -  せ/食 + こ/子  =  酵
  -  せ/食 + く/艹  =  酷
  -  せ/食 + お/頁  =  醜
  -  せ/食 + み/耳  =  醸
  -  せ/食 + せ/食 + み/耳  =  釀
  -  ひ/辶 + せ/食 + selector 3  =  逎
  -  せ/食 + 数 + て/扌  =  酊
  -  せ/食 + 比 + も/門  =  酌
  -  せ/食 + 比 + し/巿  =  酎
  -  せ/食 + 氷/氵 + 龸  =  酖
  -  せ/食 + 宿 + の/禾  =  酘
  -  せ/食 + selector 4 + る/忄  =  酣
  -  せ/食 + 龸 + の/禾  =  酥
  -  せ/食 + ほ/方 + れ/口  =  酩
  -  せ/食 + れ/口 + へ/⺩  =  酲
  -  せ/食 + 宿 + ゐ/幺  =  酳
  -  せ/食 + き/木 + き/木  =  醂
  -  せ/食 + 龸 + こ/子  =  醇
  -  せ/食 + 日 + ね/示  =  醋
  -  せ/食 + 日 + よ/广  =  醍
  -  せ/食 + れ/口 + ろ/十  =  醐
  -  せ/食 + 日 + い/糹/#2  =  醒
  -  せ/食 + 宿 + す/発  =  醗
  -  せ/食 + 比 + 数  =  醢
  -  せ/食 + へ/⺩ + selector 2  =  醤
  -  せ/食 + む/車 + selector 2  =  醪
  -  せ/食 + 宿 + く/艹  =  醯
  -  せ/食 + 龸 + た/⽥  =  醴
  -  せ/食 + す/発 + そ/馬  =  醵
  -  せ/食 + く/艹 + 火  =  醺
  -  せ/食 + 囗 + り/分  =  釁

Compounds of 酋

  -  け/犬 + せ/食  =  猶
  -  心 + け/犬 + せ/食  =  蕕
  -  せ/食 + し/巿  =  尊
  -  つ/土 + せ/食 + し/巿  =  墫
  -  み/耳 + せ/食 + し/巿  =  蹲
  -  せ/食 + せ/食 + し/巿  =  鱒
  -  ひ/辶 + せ/食  =  遵
  -  心 + せ/食 + selector 6  =  楢
  -  ひ/辶 + せ/食 + selector 6  =  遒
  -  せ/食 + せ/食 + selector 6  =  鰌
  -  せ/食 + せ/食 + selector 6  =  鰌
  -  せ/食 + 比 + け/犬  =  奠
  -  せ/食 + 宿 + け/犬  =  猷
  -  み/耳 + 宿 + せ/食  =  躑

Compounds of 千

  -  れ/口 + せ/食  =  舌
  -  え/訁 + せ/食  =  話
  -  に/氵 + せ/食  =  活
  -  も/門 + れ/口 + せ/食  =  闊
  -  も/門 + に/氵 + せ/食  =  濶
  -  せ/食 + を/貝  =  乱
  -  せ/食 + せ/食 + を/貝  =  亂
  -  せ/食 + 心  =  憩
  -  せ/食 + せ/食 + 心  =  憇
  -  せ/食 + る/忄  =  甜
  -  せ/食 + ま/石  =  辞
  -  せ/食 + せ/食 + ま/石  =  辭
  -  ぬ/力 + れ/口 + せ/食  =  刮
  -  る/忄 + れ/口 + せ/食  =  恬
  -  み/耳 + れ/口 + せ/食  =  聒
  -  ん/止 + れ/口 + せ/食  =  舐
  -  む/車 + れ/口 + せ/食  =  蛞
  -  か/金 + れ/口 + せ/食  =  銛
  -  り/分 + せ/食  =  舎
  -  り/分 + り/分 + せ/食  =  舍
  -  せ/食 + 宿 + ら/月  =  舘
  -  て/扌 + せ/食  =  捨
  -  な/亻 + 数 + せ/食  =  仟
  -  ぬ/力 + 数 + せ/食  =  刋
  -  ま/石 + 数 + せ/食  =  竏
  -  さ/阝 + 数 + せ/食  =  阡

Compounds of 青

  -  る/忄 + せ/食  =  情
  -  日 + せ/食  =  晴
  -  氷/氵 + せ/食  =  清
  -  の/禾 + せ/食  =  精
  -  ゑ/訁 + せ/食  =  請
  -  か/金 + せ/食  =  錆
  -  ま/石 + せ/食  =  靖
  -  せ/食 + 宿  =  静
  -  に/氵 + せ/食 + 宿  =  瀞
  -  せ/食 + せ/食 + 宿  =  靜
  -  な/亻 + し/巿 + せ/食  =  倩
  -  け/犬 + し/巿 + せ/食  =  猜
  -  め/目 + し/巿 + せ/食  =  睛
  -  心 + し/巿 + せ/食  =  菁
  -  む/車 + し/巿 + せ/食  =  蜻
  -  せ/食 + し/巿 + せ/食  =  鯖

Other compounds

  -  よ/广 + せ/食  =  席
  -  く/艹 + よ/广 + せ/食  =  蓆
  -  め/目 + せ/食  =  眉
  -  や/疒 + め/目 + せ/食  =  嵋
  -  い/糹/#2 + せ/食  =  繕
  -  ゆ/彳 + せ/食  =  衡
  -  さ/阝 + せ/食  =  隆
  -  や/疒 + さ/阝 + せ/食  =  嶐
  -  う/宀/#3 + さ/阝 + せ/食  =  窿
  -  ち/竹 + せ/食  =  雪
  -  ⺼ + ち/竹 + せ/食  =  膤
  -  ふ/女 + ち/竹 + せ/食  =  艝
  -  む/車 + ち/竹 + せ/食  =  轌
  -  せ/食 + ち/竹 + せ/食  =  鱈
  -  せ/食 + ぬ/力  =  制
  -  せ/食 + て/扌  =  掣
  -  せ/食 + ね/示  =  製
  -  せ/食 + い/糹/#2  =  生
  -  ゆ/彳 + せ/食 + い/糹/#2  =  徃
  -  ほ/方 + せ/食 + い/糹/#2  =  旌
  -  な/亻 + せ/食 + い/糹/#2  =  甦
  -  ち/竹 + せ/食 + い/糹/#2  =  笙
  -  せ/食 + ひ/辶  =  成
  -  せ/食 + ⺼  =  盛
  -  日 + せ/食 + ひ/辶  =  晟
  -  ち/竹 + せ/食 + ひ/辶  =  筬
  -  せ/食 + ひ/辶 + ふ/女  =  鰄
  -  せ/食 + ひ/辶 + selector 3  =  鰔
  -  せ/食 + た/⽥ + ぬ/力  =  甥
  -  つ/土 + 宿 + せ/食  =  燕
  -  れ/口 + 宿 + せ/食  =  嚥
  -  せ/食 + ん/止 + の/禾  =  囓
  -  な/亻 + 宿 + せ/食  =  雁
  -  や/疒 + 宿 + せ/食  =  雉

Notes

Braille patterns